The Gyres were a Scottish indie rock band formed in 1994 in Blantyre near Glasgow, just before the Britpop explosion.

Career
The Gyres played numerous gigs in the United Kingdom, Europe and Japan, supporting and touring with Cast, Oasis, Reef, Echobelly, Bon Jovi, and David Bowie. The band enjoyed limited success, and eventually disbanded after walking away from their independent record label, Sugar Records, whose funding had dried up. The remaining members renamed themselves Point Blank, and released an album called 50/50 at the start of the 2000s, then disbanded not long after the release of the album.

Several members are still involved in the music industry to some degree. Paul McLinden is now performing as solo artist 'Mr D', and was previously in the band Koba.

Line-up
Andy McLinden – vocals	 
Paul McLinden – guitar
Peter Lyons – lead guitar	 
Mark McGill – bass
Paddy Flaherty – drums

Michael 'The Gimp' McVey - Tour Manager
Yunis Lombard - Fluffer

Discography

Albums
First (1997)

Singles

Scottish indie rock groups
Britpop groups